Delias alberti  is a butterfly in the family Pieridae. It was described by Walter Rothschild in 1904. It is found in the Indomalayan realm.

The wingspan is about 64 mm. This species may be distinguished by the underside of the hindwings, bearing a submarginal row of orange spots in a black border, the rest of the wing being yellow.

Subspecies
Delias alberti alberti (Choiseul Island)
Delias alberti guava Arora, 1983 (Bougainville Island)
Delias alberti tetamba Arora, 1983 (St. Isabel Island)

References

External links
Delias at Markku Savela's Lepidoptera and Some Other Life Forms

alberti
Butterflies described in 1904